Byaroza or Biaroza, formerly Byaroza-Kartuzskaya, is a town in Brest Region, Belarus. It serves as the administrative center of Byaroza District. It has a population of 31,000 (1995).

History 
The village of Biaroza (meaning birch) was first mentioned in 1477 as part of the Slonim paviet. In the 15th century, the village probably received the town charter. Between 1538 and 1600 it was an important centre of Calvinism. Later the town became the private property of the Radziwiłł family.

In the Polish–Lithuanian Commonwealth

In the 17th century, the village belonged to Sapieha family, who founded a fortified monastery and a palace here. In 1648, the monastery was presented to the Carthusian monks. They came from the Italian town of Treviso and settled here. In gratitude for this deed, Pope Alexander VII granted the title of a prince to Lew Sapieha. The monastery was also expanded and became one of the biggest charterhouses (Carthusian monasteries) in the Polish–Lithuanian Commonwealth. The Carthusian order gave its name to the second part of the town's name in the form in which it has been used till late 1940s: Biaroza-Kartuzskaya (Polish: Bereza Kartuska).

During the Great Northern War, the monastery housed a conference held by King Augustus II of Poland and Peter I of Russia. In 1706, the fortified monastery was put under siege and then taken by assault and looted by the forces of Charles XII of Sweden. Two years later, the Swedish forces looted the area again, which resulted in almost total depopulation of the town. It was also damaged by the armies of Alexander Suvorov in 1772, during the Partitions of Poland.

Under Russian rule
After the partitions, the town and the monastery were annexed by Russia in 1795. After the November Uprising of 1831 the town was captured by the Russian armies and then looted. The monastery was closed by tsarist authorities and in 1866, after the January Uprising, the whole complex was partially demolished, and the bricks were used for construction of a Russian prison and barracks nearby. The baroque church was destroyed in 1868. After the uprising, the town became a part of the so-called Pale of settlement and was repopulated with Jews expelled from other areas of the Russian Empire. By the 20th century, they constituted more than 70% of the city's inhabitants. In 1842, a new road was opened between Moscow and Warsaw and passed through the town, which started a period of economic prosperity.  In 1871, a Warsaw-Moscow railroad was laid only  from the town, connecting the town with the nearby major cities of Brest and Minsk. In 1878, the town had a marketplace, 7 streets and approximately 200 houses. Both the town and the adjoining area had approximately 5,000 inhabitants. Apart from the Catholic and Uniate Churches, there was also a synagogue, Jewish baths and a market just outside the city limits.

In the 20th century
In 1915, during the First World War, the town was occupied by the Imperial Germany and in 1918 claimed by the short-lived Belarusian People's Republic. The town was captured by the Red Army on January 19, 1919, during the Soviet westward offensive of 1918–19 (Target-Vistula). Within one month, the Polish Army reclaimed the area, and recaptured the town on February 14, 1919. During the Polish-Bolshevik War the town became a notable location of two major battles including the war's very first and the second Battle of Bereza Kartuska (1920). At the end of the Polish–Soviet War the town was ceded to Poland in the Peace of Riga signed by Soviet Russia (acting also on behalf of Soviet Belarus). The peace treaty remained in force until the Soviet invasion of Poland in 1939.

Polish prison 

A Polish political prison camp was created in Bereza Kartuska in 1934. The former Russian barracks and prison were turned into an internment camp for both Polish right-wing extremists from the ONR, Ukrainian separatists from the Organization of Ukrainian Nationalists and members of the Communist Party of Poland and the Communist Party of Western Ukraine, and later also for members of opposition parties, journalists critical of the government and people suspected of common crimes. Inmates were sent there for up to three months without the involvement of the courts, based solely on the administrative decision of the police or the voivode. In this way, many Belarusians who resisted Polonization found themselves in the Bereza Kartuska camp.

The legal basis for the camp opening was openly questioned and its existence was often criticized by opponents of the Sanacja movement, which from its inception called it a "concentration camp". The camp was closed in September 1939, during the invasion of Poland.

After 1939 
In 1939 the town was captured by the Red Army and incorporated into the Byelorussian SSR. After the outbreak of the German-Soviet War, the town was captured by the German Army on 23 June 1941. The German occupation lasted until 15 July 1944. During this time, Byaroza was administered as a part of Generalbezirk Wolhynien und Podolien of Reichskommissariat Ukraine.

During World War II, a ghetto was created in the town for Jews who fled there from the surrounding areas. Under the Nazi German occupying administration — which had merged Byaroza, along with most of western Polesia, into the Reichskommissariat Ukraine — more than 8,000 people were killed in mass executions or were starved to death. Numerous pro-Soviet and pro-Ukrainian partisan units were active in the area around Byaroza before Red Army troops finally liberated the town on 15 July 1944. Repopulated with Belarusian and Russian peasants, the town was rebuilt after the destruction of World War II. After a minor building materials factory was opened in the town, another period of fast growth followed.

During the postwar period a Soviet aviation military base was placed close to Biaroza.

In 1958-1967 a hydroelectric power station was built in the Biaroza Raion.

In 1991, after the dissolution of the USSR, the town became part of the independent Republic of Belarus.

Mayors
 Berl (Dov) Ribak (1882 - 1915)
 Naftali Levinson (1915 - 1919 acting, 1919 - 1939?)

Heads of Biaroza District Executive Committee
 Yury Narkevich (2005 - 2016)
 Leanid Martyniuk (since 2016)

Landmarks 
Although the 17th-century monastery was mostly destroyed in the 19th century, there are some ruins remaining. Among them are:
 Historical gateway with a decorative façade
 Parts of fortifications surrounding the monastery with several towers partially preserved
 Ruins of the octagonal church tower
 Ruins of the hospital
 Several buildings later incorporated into the tsarist prison.

People from Byaroza
 Jakob Klatzkin, Jewish philosopher
 Kadia Molodowsky, Jewish poet and writer
 Kseniya Koçyiğit, Belarusian-born Azerbaijani professional volleyball player

See also 
 Battle of Bereza Kartuska

Notes

References

External links 

 Photos on Radzima.org
 Biaroza on Googlemaps
 Kartuz-Bereza, Our Town Memorial Book on JewishGen
 Kartuz-Bereza cemetery
 

 
Cities in Belarus
Populated places in Brest Region
Pruzhansky Uyezd
Polesie Voivodeship
Holocaust locations in Belarus
Byaroza District